"Unusually Unusual" is a song written by Mark McGuinn and recorded by American country music group Lonestar. It was released in August 2002 as the fourth and final single from the album I'm Already There. It peaked at number 12 on the U.S. Billboard Hot Country Singles & Tracks chart.

Content
In the song the narrator talks about how his significant other is "unusually unusual" because of the things she does. He talks about how her personality is beautiful to him.

Chart positions

References

2002 singles
2001 songs
Lonestar songs
Song recordings produced by Dann Huff
BNA Records singles
Songs written by Mark McGuinn